Erigeron multiradiatus is an Asian species of flowering plants in the family Asteraceae known by the common name Himalayan fleabane. It grows at high elevations in the mountains of central and south-central Asia, in Iran, Afghanistan, Bhutan, India, Nepal and Tibet.

Erigeron multiradiatus is a branching perennial herb up to 60 centimeters (2 feet) tall, producing a woody rhizome. The plant generally has several Flower heads per stem, each head containing numerous lilac or lavender or purple ray florets surrounding many yellow disc florets.

References

Flora of Asia
multiradiatus
Plants described in 1849